Strata-cut animation, also spelled stratcut or straticut, is a form of clay animation, itself one of many forms of stop motion animation.

Strata-cut animation is most commonly a form of clay animation in which a long bread-like "loaf" of clay, internally packed tight and loaded with varying imagery, is sliced into thin sheets, with the animation camera taking a frame of the end of the loaf for each cut, eventually revealing the movement of the internal images within. Wax may be used instead of clay for the loaf, but this can be more difficult to use because it is less malleable.

Experimentally toyed with in both clay and blocks of wax by German animator Oskar Fischinger and his associate Walter Rutmann during the 1920s and 1930s, a crude form is specifically found in the Lotte Reiniger film "Prince Achmed".  The technique was revived, named and highly refined with precision and control in the mid-1980s by California-Oregon animator David Daniels, a past associate of Will Vinton, in his 16-minute short film Buzz Box. 

The method of strata-cut animation has also been used in the music video for "Big Time" by Peter Gabriel (1986), also for the "ABC" part of Michael Jackson's Moonwalker video compilation, and the title sequence for the 1993 film Freaked. Daniels has also used it as background imagery as other forms of animation or live action is superimposed over it.

Designing the interior contents of a clay block is a complex art form in and of itself.  Obviously, abstract images and patterns are easier to do than recognizable images or character-driven moving images.  Both the pace and forms of the movements of the internal imagery have to be considered when building the block (or loaf).  A kind of non-high-tech "underground" quality of the all-moving imagery is usually the result, which has its own level of charm, unique to that process.

Interesting abstract images can be created by folding strips of different-colored clay together, and then flattening them out again, so they can be folded again, repeating this process until the final result is a relatively tight mosaic of "woven" patterns, interesting to the eye, even in its static (unmoving) form, but even more so when animated via the strata-cut process.  Eventually, a series of blocks of these mosaics can be combined into single blocks (loafs) and also combined with non-abstract imagery.

Although David Daniels' Buzz Box   is his showcase for all these techniques, he has also used variations of them for a variety of TV commercials and bits made for the Pee Wee's Playhouse series during the mid-1980s, also "10th Anniversary Birthday", a network ID for MTV, and an 'acid trip' section from the television series 'Gary and Mike'. In reference to the 'time sculpted extrusion block' or 'geometry loaf' slice-reveal technique, Daniels coined the visual results or look as ‘insanimation’ in 1984 while a graduate student at Cal Arts.

References

Sources

External links
Explanation at StopMoWorks, with a diagram and links
Buzz Box review
Bent Image Lab David Daniel's Company

Animation techniques
Clay animation